A special election for Ohio's 12th congressional district was held August 7, 2018, following the resignation of Republican U.S. Representative Pat Tiberi. The Republican Party nominated State Senator Troy Balderson for the seat while the Democratic Party nominated Franklin County Recorder Danny O'Connor. Balderson led O'Connor in preliminary results; however, the race was not officially called on election night. Counting of outstanding ballots began on August 18 and was completed on August 24. The outstanding ballots did not change the margin enough to trigger an automatic recount, so Balderson was declared the winner on August 24.

Background
On October 19, 2017, nine-term incumbent Republican Representative Pat Tiberi announced that he would leave office before January 31, 2018, in order to lead the Ohio Business Roundtable. On January 3, 2018, he announced that he would officially resign January 15. On January 5, Ohio Governor John Kasich set the primaries for the special election for May 8, and the general election for August 7. The winner of this special election would serve for five months until January 2019, unless also elected in the regularly scheduled November general election.

Ohio's 12th congressional district at the time was located in the central portion of the state and included all of Delaware, Licking, and Morrow counties as well as portions of Franklin, Marion, Muskingum, and Richland counties. The district had been in Republican hands for all but one term since 1939, and without interruption since 1983.

Republican primary

Candidates

Nominee
Troy Balderson, state senator

Eliminated in primary
Kevin Bacon, state senator
Lawrence Cohen, accountant
Jon Halverstadt, real estate investor
Tim Kane, economist, former air force intelligence officer
Melanie Leneghan, Liberty Township Trustee
Pat Manley, architect
Carol O'Brien, Delaware County Prosecutor

Declined
Andrew Brenner, state representative (running for state senate)
Anne Gonzales, state representative (running for state senate)
John Kasich, Governor and former U.S. Representative
Clarence Mingo, Franklin County Auditor (endorsed Kevin Bacon)
J. D. Vance, author and venture capitalist

Endorsements

Polling

Results

Democratic primary

Candidates

Nominee
Danny O'Connor, Franklin County Recorder

Eliminated in primary
Ed Albertson, businessman and nominee for OH-12 in 2016
Jackie Patton, nurse
John Peters, special education teacher
John Russell, farmer and nominee for State Representative in 2016
Zach Scott, former Franklin County Sheriff
Doug Wilson, health care professional

Withdrew
Crystal Lett, healthcare advocate

Declined
Jeremy Blake, Newark city councilman (running for state representative)
Jay Goyal, former state representative and small business owner

Endorsements

Results

Independents

Candidates

Withdrawn
Jonathan Veley, attorney

General election

Candidates
Troy Balderson (Republican), state senator
Joe Manchik (Green), small business owner
Danny O'Connor (Democratic),  Franklin County Recorder

Predictions

Endorsements

Polling

Results

O'Connor dominated the district's portion of Franklin County, home to the largest share of the district's population. However, he could not overcome a 4,800-vote deficit in normally heavily Republican Delaware County, the largest whole county in the district. Still, this was the closest that a Democrat had come to winning the district since 1982.

County results

References

External links
Troy Balderson (R) for Congress
Joe Manchik (G) for Congress
Danny O’ Connor (D) for Congress

Ohio 2018 12
Ohio 2018 12
2018 12 Special
Ohio 12 Special
United States House of Representatives 12 Special
United States House of Representatives 2018 12
August 2018 events in the United States